Grand Prince Neungwon (Hangul: 능원대군, Hanja: 綾原大君; 15 May 1598 - 26 January 1656), personal name Yi Bo (Hangul: 이보, Hanja: 李俌) was a Korean Politician in the Late Joseon dynasty. He was also a Korean Royal Prince as the second son of Wonjong of Joseon and Queen Inheon of the Neungseong Gu clan. He was the younger brother of Injo of Joseon.

Biography

Early life
The future Grand Prince Neungwon was born on 15 May 1598 (31st year reign of Seonjo of Joseon) in Seongcheon, Pyeongan-do, Kingdom of Joseon as the second son of Prince Jeongwon (정원군, 定遠君) and Princess Consort Yeonju of the Neungseong Gu clan (연주군부인, 連珠郡夫人) during the Late Imjin War periods (임진왜란). Since child, he was spent a brief childhood in Pyeongyang-si, Pyeongan-do and grew up in his father's private residence in Hanseong-bu.

Meanwhile, later in 1608 (41st year reign of his grandfather, Seonjo of Joseon), at 11 years old, Bo was adopted as his 1st uncle, Prince Uian (의안군)'s son. However, Prince Uian at 12 years old and later, in 1601, Bo was given royal title Master Neungwon (능원수, 綾原守) at first and later changed into Prince Neungwon (능원군) in 1608.

During Gwanghaegun of Joseon's reign

In 1608 (Gwanghaegun's ascension to the throne), immediately after Yu Yeong-Gyeong (유영경)'s death in prison, the Prince become of Jeongunwonjonggongsin rank 1 (정운원종공신 1등). Later, in 1613 (5th year reign of Gwanghaegun), after Prince Imhae (임해군) was imprisoned, he became Iksawonjonggongsin rank 1 (익사원종공신 1등). However, 4 years later in 1617 (10th year reign of Gwanghaegun), he was participated in the discussion on the abolition of Dowager Queen Inmok (인목대비) as the senior person in the palace. Other bureaucrats whom participated in these discussion were punished, but he wasn't got punished.

During Injo of Joseon's reign
Later, on 13 March 1623, his big brother, Prince Neungyang (능양군) make a rebellion and then ascended the throne. However, when their youngest brother, Prince Neungchang (능창군) was exiled to Gyo-dong on charges of treason in 1615 (7th year reign of Gwanghaegun of Joseon), he was immediately killed and died in there. Heard if the youngest brother was death, their father, Wonjong was so heartbroken over this and while drinking the alcohol, he died on 2 February 1619 (11st year reign of Gwanghaegun of Joseon) at 40 years old.

Then, on 22 December in the same year, Neungwon became an officer in Sodeokdaebu (소덕대부). However, in March 1625 (Injo's 3rd year reign), a man named Jeong Yeong-Sin (정영신), the servant of Neungwon's adopted father was beaten and got killed.

At this time, there were some ministers accused him, but Injo only believed the words of the servants who betrayed him and didn't conducted the investigation fairly,  instead ordered the ministers to left. Afterwards, both of Yun Sun-Ji (윤순지) and Gim-Yu (김유) were filed an appeal for fear that the state's words would be blocked and Injo then apologized for being too excessive.

However, on 28 November 1625 (Injo's 3rd year reign), when his mother, Lady Gyewoon (계운궁, 啓運宮) became critically ill, Injo specially offered Hyeollokdaebu (현록대부) to Neungwon in order to comfort his biological mother. Later, when their mother passed away on 10 February 1626, Neungwon become the resident instead of Injo. Numerous ministers argued that Neungwon, who had already been adopted by Prince Uian, couldn't be Lady Gyewoon's resident, but Injo didn't grant permission and refused it. After that, Neungwon must faced a difficult life because he was being dismissed from the office and must divorced from his wife, Lady Yu (유씨) because her father was failed in conspiracy to make Prince Inseong (인성군), the first son of Seonjo of Joseon and Royal Noble Consort Jeong of the Yeoheung Min clan as the new King to succeed Gwanghae in the throne, so King Injo demanded him to divorced from her. At first, he refused this, but later removed her title and demoted to just be his concubine (첩, 妾). Although that, she can still able to lived in his home.
  
Meanwhile, when Injo concerned about his small house, Injo fell wrong with this and gave him a special palace in Yihyeon (이현, 梨峴), Hanseong-bu as his house. Later, on 17 September 1628 (Injo's 5th year reign), Neungwon became Somuwonjonggongsin rank 1 (소무원종공신 1등).

After Military Service and ranks
Later, after Injo's ascension to the throne, their father was honoured as King Wonjong (원종왕, 元宗王) and their mother was honoured as Queen Inheon (인헌왕후, 仁獻王后). Then, on 4 May 1623 (Injo's 10th year reign), he was honoured as Grand Prince Neungwon (능원대군, 綾原大君) along with his younger brother who died as Grand Prince Neungchang (능창대군, 綾昌大君). In 1645 (Injo's 23rd year reign), he received a portion of the envoys from Dorgon (도르곤) who was the Prince regent of Qing dynasty.

Later, in September 1646 (24th year reign of Injo of Joseon), after Sim Gi-won (심기원)'s rebellion case was ended, Neungwon became Yeonggukgongsin (영국공신, 寧國功臣) and then Yeonggukwonjonggongsin (영국원종공신, 寧國元從功臣) in September 1646 (Injo's 24th year reign).

Faction
Famous figures of his faction (능원대군파) were such as the Politician Yi Jin-Yong (정치인 이진용) and the playwright Yi Hae-Rang (연극인 이해랑). Meanwhile, since the Prince was adopted by his 1st uncle, his faction was sometimes called as Prince Uian Faction (의안군파).

Died and later life
He later died on 26 January 1656 (7th year reign of his nephew, Hyojong of Joseon) at 57 years old and received his Posthumous name, then, was buried in Nokchon-ri, Hwado-eup, Namyangju-si, Gyeonggi-do along with his wife. On the other hand, it was said that he also claimed the theory of Cheokhwa (척화) together with Gim Sang-Heon (김상헌), who was a presiding officer at the time, despite the growing public opinion insisting on strengthening the Qing dynasty.

He was also ignorant of Buddhism and didn't even look the cause, but after his 1st father in-law, Yu Hyo-Rib (유효립) was punished and exiled, he faced his wife, wept and complained about this. It was said that he lived together as before without any regrets.

Family
Grand Prince Neungwon had 20 grandchildren and 45 middle-grandsons, almost of them were lived with prospering. His Sindo (신도) was written by Song Siyeol (송시열) and Jo Sa-U (조사우).

Father: 
Biological - Wonjong of Joseon (2 August 1580 - 29 December 1619) (조선 원종)
Adopted (Uncle) - Yi Seong, Prince Uian (이성 의안군) (1577 - 20 March 1588)
Grandfather - Seonjo of Joseon (26 November 1552 - 16 March 1608) (조선 선조왕)
Grandmother - Royal Noble Consort In of the Suwon Kim clan (1555 - 10 December 1613) (인빈 김씨)
Mother - Queen Inheon of the Neungseong Gu clan (17 April 1578 - 14 January 1626) (인헌왕후 구씨)
Grandfather - Gu Sa-maeng, Duke Munui, Internal Prince Neungan (1531 - 1 April 1604) (구사맹 문의공 능안부원군)
Grandmother - Internal Princess Consort Pyeongsan of the Pyeongsan Sin clan (1538 - 1562) (평산부부인 평산 신씨)
Sibling(s):
Older brother - Yi Jong, Grand Prince Neungyang (7 December 1595 - 17 June 1649) (이종 능양대군)
Sister-in-law - Queen Inryeol of the Cheongju Han clan (16 August 1594 - 16 January 1636) (인열왕후 한씨)
 Nephew - Yi Wang, Crown Prince Sohyeon (5 February 1612 – 21 May 1645) (이왕 소현세자)
 Nephew - Yi Ho, King Hyojong (봉림대군) (3 July 1619 – 23 June 1659)
 Nephew - Yi Yo, Grand Prince Inpyeong (10 December 1622 – 13 May 1658) (이요 인평대군)
 Nephew - Yi Gon, Grand Prince Yongseong (24 October 1624 – 22 December 1629) (이곤 용성대군)
 Unnamed niece (1626 - 1626)
 Unnamed nephew (1629 - 1629)
 Unnamed nephew (12 January 1635 - 16 January 1635)
Sister-in-law - Queen Jangryeol of the Yangju Jo clan (16 December 1624 - 20 September 1688) (장렬왕후 조씨) — No issue.
Younger brother - Yi Jeon, Grand Prince Neungchang (16 July 1599 - 17 November 1615) (이전 능창대군)
Sister-in-law - Grand Princess Consort Gu of the Neungseong Gu clan (부부인 능성 구씨)
 Adoptive nephew - Yi Yo, Grand Prince Inpyeong (인평대군 요) (1622 - 1658); 3rd son of King Injo
Consorts and their Respective Issue(s):
Grand Princess Consort Munhwa of the Munhwa Ryu clan (27 October 1598 - 3 August 1676) (문화부부인 문화 류씨)
Grand Princess Consort of the Yeongam Kim clan (9 March 1610 - 25 January 1696) (부부인 영암 김씨)
Yi Sik, Prince Yeongpung (? - 1692) (이식 영풍군)
Yi Ham, Prince Yeongeun (이함 영은군)
Yi Hyeong, Prince Yeongsin (이형 영신군)
Yi Jeong, Prince Yeongchun (이정 영춘군)
Yi Yu (이유)
Lady Yi (이씨)
Lady Yi Yeong-Jeong (1639 - 1657) (이영정, 李英淨)
Lady Yi (이씨)

Legacy
His tomb designated as Gyeonggi-do Cultural Heritage Material No. 115 on 16 September 2002 by the Cultural Heritage Administration of the Republic of Korea.

References

External links
 능원대군 in Encykorea (in Korean). Retrieved June 5, 2021.

1598 births
1656 deaths
Korean princes
House of Yi
16th-century Korean people
17th-century Korean people